Kosovo Polje ("Kosovo Field") or Fushë Kosova, is a town and municipality located in the District of Pristina in central Kosovo. According to the 2011 census, the town of Kosovo Polje has 12,919 inhabitants, while the municipality has 33,977 inhabitants, a number continuously on the rise.

Geography 
It is served by the Kosovo Polje railway station.

History 
Kosovo Polje was named after the Kosovo Field of the 1389 Battle of Kosovo. The settlement of Kosovo Polje was established in 1921 during the Kingdom of Yugoslavia (see Colonisation of Kosovo).

Prior to the 1999 Kosovo War, the town of Kosovo Polje had, according to the figures of the Federal Statistical Office in Belgrade from March 1991, a total population of 35,570 inhabitants, while the ethnic makeup was 56.6% Albanian, 23.7% Serb and 19.6% from other communities.

In the city suburbs there is the Multinational Specialized Unit base. Part of KFOR, the unit is composed entirely by Italian Carabinieri.

Economy
There are two magnesium mines operating on the territory of Kosovo Polje: Goleš and Strezovce.

Demographics

According to the last official census done in 2011, the municipality of Kosovo Polje has 34,827 inhabitants. Based on the population estimates from the Kosovo Agency of Statistics in 2016, the municipality has 37,591 inhabitants.

Ethnic groups
The ethnic composition of the municipality:

Annotations

References

External links

 Republic of Kosovo municipality of Fushe Kosove/Kosovo Polje

 
Municipalities of Kosovo
Cities in Kosovo